Greta Sebald (born 18 November 1965) is a Greek luger. She competed in the women's singles event at the 1994 Winter Olympics.

References

External links
 

1965 births
Living people
Greek female lugers
Olympic lugers of Greece
Lugers at the 1994 Winter Olympics
Place of birth missing (living people)